Dubek Ltd., is the sole Israeli cigarette manufacturing company, headquartered in Petah Tikva. Established in 1935, the company produces, markets and distributes cigarettes, cigars, lighters and smoking devices and accessories in Israel, the Palestinian Authority, Gaza Strip, the West Bank, as well as overseas.

Dubek also imports and distributes tobacco products, cigars, electronic and stone lighters, rolling paper and energy drinks like Redbull and BLU. It markets and sells its products to large retail chain stores, local grocery shops, convenience stores and tobacco stores through sales and service representatives across Israel. Dubek's cigarettes do not contain chametz and kitniyot, and tobacco products are tested to be kosher for Passover and also all year round.

History

Dubek was established in 1935 by Martin Gehl, a German-Jewish immigrant. In 1960, Dubek became one of the first companies to be publicly traded on the Tel Aviv Stock Exchange. Gehl and his son Zorach, expanded the business and took over all other cigarette manufacturers in Israel. In 2003 Dubek became a private company. Today the company is headed by Dr. Roy Gehl, Martin Gehl's grandson and its main offices are located in Petah Tikva on Martin Gehl Street, named for the company's founder.

Operations
Dubek Ltd operates through its wholesalers, reaching over 10,000 retail outlets throughout the country ranging from the large supermarket down to the local grocery store and small kiosk. In addition to its activity in the local market, Dubek distributes its brands to regions under the control of the Palestinian Authority and manufactures "white labels" for customers overseas.

The distribution networks is operated by Dubek's Marketing division and deploys sales promotion initiatives as well as supervision by a sophisticated CRM system which enables real time control over availability, stock levels, visiting frequency and market activities.

Brands

Time
Noblesse
Golf
Highway
Royal
Mustang
Nelson
Sheraton
Broadway
Montana
Europa
Black Devil
Maryland
TLV

See also
Economy of Israel
Smoking in Jewish law

References

External links
 Dubek Ltd. on Dunn's 100 2007

Tobacco companies of Israel
Companies based in Petah Tikva